Tracking may refer to:

Science and technology

Computing 
 Tracking, in computer graphics, in match moving (insertion of graphics into footage)
 Tracking, composing music with music tracker software
 Eye tracking, measuring the position of the eye relative to the head
 Finger tracking, measuring the positions of the fingers
 Optical motion tracking, or motion capture, recording the precise movements of objects or people
 Position tracking, monitoring the location of a mechanical system in real-time by counting pulses; see 
 Positional tracking, an essential component of augmented reality
 Video tracking, locating an object in each frame of a video sequence
 Mobile phone tracking, monitoring the physical location of a mobile phone
 Internet tracking, analyzing online activity
 Web visitor tracking, the analysis of visitor behavior on a website
 Sleep tracking, monitoring sleeping experience (deep, REM, duration etc.)

Life sciences 
 Animal migration tracking, performed by attaching a tag to an animal
 Tracking (hunting), to learn about the ecology of an area
 Environmental tracking, a concept developed by the Environmental Investment Organisation to monitor climate change

Logistics 
 Tracking (commercial airline flight), the means of tracking civil airline flights in real time
 Package tracking, or package logging, the process of localizing shipping containers, mail and parcel post
 Track and trace, a process of determining the current and past locations and other status of property in transit
 Asset tracking, which provides status of objects of an inventory or mobile stock
 Vehicle tracking system uses GPS to find out about movement and/or location of cars, trucks, and/or other vehicles

Other uses in science and technology 
 Tracking (particle physics), measuring the direction and magnitude of the momenta of charged particles
 Tracking, a process of degradation in which tree-like carbonized patterns (electrical treeing) appear on an insulator 
 Tracking or Toe (automotive), the symmetric angle that each wheel makes with the long axis of a vehicle
 Video tape tracking, alignment of the magnetic tape of a video recorder with the read head
 Tracking, combining individual radar detections with a radar tracker
 Tracking system, various methods used to monitor moving persons or objects, often remotely
 Tracking transmitter, a device that broadcasts a radio signal that can be detected by a directional antenna
 Target and missile tracking, elements of Go-Onto-Target systems in missile guidance
 Tracking is also used, euphemistically, for surveillance or mass surveillance
 Multitrack recording, a term commonly shortened to "tracking"

Arts and entertainment 
 Tracking (documentary), a 1994 documentary about the band Phish
 Tracking (novel), a three-part work by David R. Palmer
 Tracking shot, a filming technique also known as a dolly shot

Sports 
 Tracking (dog), the act of a dog following a scent trail
 Tracking (freeflying), in skydiving, the technique of moving horizontally while in freefall
 Tracking (hunting), the art of learning about a place via animal trails and other environmental evidence
 Tracking trial, a dog competition

Other uses 
 Tracking (education), separating children into classes according to academic ability
 Tracking (scouting), a scouting activity focused on observation, stalking, and following a trail
 Tracking, typographers' term for letter-spacing, uniformly increasing or decreasing the space between all letters in a block of text
 Tracking, matching or comparing the performance of a financial portfolio to a stock market index

See also 
 Trace (disambiguation)
 Tracing (disambiguation)
 Track (disambiguation)
 Tracker (disambiguation)
 Tracking software (disambiguation)